Events from the year 1996 in France.

Incumbents
 President – Jacques Chirac
 Prime Minister – Alain Juppé

Events
8 January – Former president of France and founder of the Socialist Party of France, François Mitterrand, dies.
29 January – President Jacques Chirac announces a "definitive end" to French nuclear testing.
5 May – A fire in Paris destroys much of Crédit Lyonnais bank's headquarters.
23 May – Members of the Armed Islamic Group in Algeria kill seven French Trappist monks, after talks with French government concerning the imprisonment of several GIA sympathisers break down.
27 – 29 June – 22nd G7 summit takes place in Lyon.
8 October – Launch of Renault Mégane Scénic, a five-seater mini MPV based on the floorpan of the standard Mégane hatchback.
18 November – Channel Tunnel fire on a truck being carried on an HGV shuttle.
Full date unknown:
 Tennis Elbow video game is released in November 1996.

Arts and literature
26th January - 24th March 1996 The Traffic (art exhibition) was on show CAPC Musée d'art Contemporain de Bordeaux

La Dernière Fête produced by Pierre Granier-Deferre was released

Sport
29 June – Tour de France begins.
30 June – French Grand Prix won by Damon Hill of the United Kingdom.
21 July – Tour de France ends, won by Bjarne Riis of Denmark.

Births

7 February – Pierre Gasly, racing driver
8 February – Lys Mousset, footballer
23 February – Modibo Tounkara, footballer
26 February – Bertille Noël-Bruneau, actress.
21 March – Adam Ellis, grasstrack and speedway rider.
26 April – Laurine Lecavelier, figure skater.
9 May – Caroline Costa, singer and TV presenter.
13 June – Kingsley Coman, footballer.
21 June – Léa Lemare, ski jumper.
29 June – Estelle Elizabeth, ice dancer.
12 August – Oscar Laurent, singer-songwriter.
14 August – Neal Maupay, footballer.
27 August – Estel-Anaïs Hubaud, competitor.
17 September – Esteban Ocon, racing driver
20 September – Anaïs Ventard, figure skater.
22 September – Anthoine Hubert, racing driver (died 2019)
27 September – Maxwel Cornet, footballer
12 December – Mathéo Tuscher, Swiss-born racing driver.
17 December – Anne Kuhm, gymnast.

Full date unknown
 Bahia Bakari

Deaths

January
8 January – François Mitterrand, President of France from 1981 to 1995 (born 1916).
15 January – Max Varnel, film and television director (born 1925).

February
6 February – Jacques Wertheimer, businessman (born 1911).
11 February – Pierre Edouard Leopold Verger, photographer and ethnographer (born 1902).
14 February – Louis Finot, international soccer player (born 1909).
17 February – Hervé Bazin, writer (born 1911).

March
2 March – Célestin Delmer, international soccer player (born 1907).
3 March – Marguerite Duras, writer and film director (born 1914).
3 March – Léo Malet, novelist (born 1909).
17 March – René Clément, screenwriter and film director (born 1913).
20 March – Claude Bourdet, writer, journalist and politician (born 1909).
22 March – Claude Mauriac, author and journalist (born 1914).
24 March – Jean-Claude Piumi, soccer player (born 1940).
29 March – Christophe Caze, terrorist (born 1969).

April to June
21 April – Robert Hersant, newspaper magnate (born 1920).
29 April – François Picard, motor racing driver (born 1921).
25 May – Barney Wilen, saxophonist and jazz composer (born 1937).
30 May – Léon-Etienne Duval, cardinal (born 1903).
15 June – Raymond Salles, rower (born 1920).
15 June – Yvonne Vallée, actress (born 1899).

July to September
17 July – Paul Touvier, convicted of crime against humanity for his Collaborationist role during Vichy France (born 1915).
29 July – Marcel-Paul Schützenberger, mathematician (born 1920).
2 August – Michel Debré, politician and first Prime Minister of the Fifth Republic (born 1912).
4 August – André Trochut, cyclist (born 1931).
30 August – Christine Pascal, actress, writer and director (born 1953).

October to December
11 October – Pierre Grimal, historian and classicist (born 1912).
12 October – René Lacoste, tennis player (born 1904).
12 October – Roger Lapébie, cyclist, won the 1937 Tour de France (born 1911).
15 October – Pierre Franey, chef and food writer (born 1921).
17 October – Jean-Pierre Munch, cyclist (born 1926).
26 October – Henri Lepage, fencer (born 1908).
31 October – Marcel Carné, film director (born 1906).
3 December – Georges Duby, historian (born 1919).
3 December – Jean Tabaud, artist (born 1914).
9 December – Alain Poher, politician (born 1909).
11 December – Marie-Claude Vaillant-Couturier, member of the French Resistance (born 1912).
21 December – Alfred Tonello, cyclist (born 1929).
25 December – Roger Duchesne, actor (born 1906).
25 December – Gabriel Loire, stained glass artist (born 1904).
29 December – Mireille Hartuch, singer, composer and actress (born 1906).

Full date unknown
André-Georges Haudricourt, anthropologist and linguist (born 1911).

See also
 List of French films of 1996

References

1990s in France